Štefánik Tournament in Bratislava was an annual summer international football tournament in honor of the Slovak politician, diplomat, and astronomer Milan Rastislav Štefánik held in Bratislava, Czechoslovakia, from 1932 to 1933. The tournament was held in the month of June.

The teams played 3 round-robin 90-minute matches in the tournament.

Finals

References

External links
 Stefanik Tournament at Rec.Sport.Soccer Statistics Foundation.

International association football competitions hosted by Czechoslovakia
1931–32 in Austrian football
1932–33 in French football
1931–32 in Czechoslovak football
1932–33 in Czechoslovak football
1931–32 in Hungarian football
1932–33 in Hungarian football